Phylledestes is an extinct genus of butterfly from the Miocene shales of Florissant, Colorado. It contains only one species, Phylledestes vorax, described from a fossil larva. Its family and superfamily placement is uncertain, though it has been proposed to belong to the family Noctuidae of the superfamily Noctuoidea.

See also
Prehistoric Lepidoptera
Prehistoric insects
Florissant Fossil Beds National Monument

References

Further reading

Fossil Lepidoptera
†
Prehistoric insects of North America
Miocene insects
Fossil taxa described in 1907